Bulgarian-Montenegrin relations are foreign relations between Bulgaria and Montenegro. Relations between the two were originally established in 1896 while Montenegro had been a kingdom and Bulgaria had exercised special self-governing status while nominally part of the Ottoman Empire. Bulgaria recognized Montenegro on June 12, 2006. The modern countries established diplomatic relations on August 2, 2006. Both countries are full members of the Council of Europe, and of NATO. Bulgaria is an EU member and Montenegro is an EU candidate.

See also
Foreign relations of Bulgaria
Foreign relations of Montenegro 
Accession of Montenegro to the European Union
Bulgaria–Yugoslavia relations

External links
 Bulgarian embassy in Podgorica (in Bulgarian only)

 
Montenegro 
Bilateral relations of Montenegro